The Women's Heptathlon at the 2009 World Championships in Athletics was held at the Olympic Stadium on August 16 and August 17. A number of high-profile heptathletes did not feature at the competition, including defending champion Carolina Klüft and 2007 bronze medallist Kelly Sotherton, who were both injured, and Olympic silver medallist Hyleas Fountain, who failed to qualify at the national championships.

Nataliya Dobrynska, the 2008 Olympic champion, was highly favoured to win the event, while Great Britain's Jessica Ennis was predicted to improve upon her own world leading mark of 6587 points. Tatyana Chernova, Ukrainians Hanna Melnychenko and Lyudmyla Yosypenko, and Germans Jennifer Oeser and Lilli Schwarzkopf were cited as medal contenders.

After the first day, Ennis had built up a considerable lead, winning three of the four events and ending the day more than three hundred points ahead of second-ranked Dobrynska. Ennis' first day total of 4124 points was the third highest ever first day score in the heptathlon, behind Kluft and world record holder Jackie Joyner-Kersee. On the second day, unusually for a heptathlon competition, Linda Züblin set a Swiss record in the javelin throw. Ennis maintained her lead with competitive marks in the long jump and javelin throw (her weaker events) and she won the final 800 metres race, gaining her first major championship gold medal and setting a world leading mark and much improved personal best of 6731 points. Olympic champion Dobrynska faded into fourth place on the final day, while Jennifer Oeser set a personal best for the silver medal and Kamila Chudzik took bronze, Poland's first ever heptathlon medal at the competition.

The competition represented a breakthrough for Ennis, who had missed the 2008 Beijing Olympics through injury and whose previous best result was fourth place at the 2007 World Championships. She was Great Britain's first gold medallist of the tournament, and she became the country's third woman multi-eventer to win a major global championship, after former Olympic champions Mary Peters and Denise Lewis.

Medalists

Records

Qualification standards

Schedule

Results

100 metres hurdles

Key: PB = Personal best, SB = Seasonal best

High jump

Key: PB = Personal best, SB = Seasonal best

Shot put

Key: PB = Personal best, SB = Seasonal best

200 metres

Key: PB = Personal best, SB = Seasonal best

Long jump

Key: PB = Personal best, SB = Seasonal best

Javelin throw

Key:  NR = National record, PB = Personal best, SB = Seasonal best

800 metres

Key: PB = Personal best, SB = Seasonal best

Final standings

Key:  DNF = Did not finish, PB = Personal best, SB = Seasonal best, WL = World leading (in a given season)

References
General
Heptathlon results. IAAF. Retrieved on 2009-08-15.
Specific

Heptathlon
Heptathlon at the World Athletics Championships
2009 in women's athletics